The United States secretary of health and human services is the head of the United States Department of Health and Human Services, and serves as the principal advisor to the president of the United States on all health matters. The secretary is a member of the United States Cabinet. The office was formerly Secretary of Health, Education, and Welfare. In 1980, the Department of Health, Education, and Welfare was renamed the Department of Health and Human Services, and its education functions and Rehabilitation Services Administration were transferred to the new United States Department of Education. Patricia Roberts Harris headed the department before and after it was renamed.

Nominations to the office of Secretary of HHS are referred to the Health, Education, Labor and Pensions Committee and the United States Senate Committee on Finance, which has jurisdiction over Medicare and Medicaid, before confirmation is considered by the full United States Senate.

Secretary of Health and Human Services is a Level I position in the Executive Schedule, thus earning a salary of US$221,400, as of January 2021.

Xavier Becerra has served as the 25th United States secretary of health and human services since March 19, 2021, the first person of Hispanic descent to hold the post.

Duties

The duties of the secretary revolve around human conditions and concerns in the United States. This includes advising the president on matters of health, welfare, and income security programs. The secretary strives to administer the Department of Health and Human Services to carry out approved programs and make the public aware of the objectives of the department.

The Department of Health, Education and Welfare (HEW) was reorganized into a Department of Education and a Department of Health and Human Services (US DHHS).

The Department of Health and Human Services oversees 11 agencies including the Food and Drug Administration (FDA), Centers for Disease Control (CDC), National Institutes of Health (NIH), Administration for Children and Families (ACF) and Centers for Medicare & Medicaid Services (CMS).

List of secretaries
 Parties
 (9)
 (15)
 (1)

Status

Line of succession
The line of succession for the Secretary of Health and Human Services is as follows:
Deputy Secretary of Health and Human Services.
General Counsel of the Department of Health and Human Services
Assistant Secretary for Administration
Assistant Secretary for Planning and Evaluation
Administrator of the Centers for Medicare and Medicaid Services
Commissioner of Food and Drugs
Director of the National Institutes of Health
Assistant Secretary for Children and Families
Other assistant secretaries (following in the order they took the oath of office)
Assistant Secretary for Health
Assistant Secretary for Preparedness and Response
Assistant Secretary for Legislation
Assistant Secretary for Public Affairs
Assistant Secretary for Financial Resources
Assistant Secretary for Aging
Director of the Centers for Disease Control and Prevention
Director, Region 4 (Atlanta, Georgia)

References

External links
 
Department Of Health And Human Services Meeting Notices and Rule Changes  from The Federal Register RSS Feed

Marcia Fudge

Health and Human Services
Secretary of Health and Human Services
Health and Human Services
 
1980 establishments in the United States